Charitaheen or Choritrohin may refer to:

Choritrohin - a Bengali novel by Sarat Chandra Chattopadhyay
Charitraheen, 1974 Bollywood film based on Choritrohin
Charitraheen (film), 1975 Bangladeshi film based on Choritrohin
Charitraheen (web series), 2018 Bengali television series